Morgan is a town in Oconto County, Wisconsin, United States. The population was 882 at the 2000 census. The unincorporated communities of Morgan and Sampson are located in the town.

Geography
According to the United States Census Bureau, the town has a total area of 35.6 square miles (92.3 km2), of which, 35.6 square miles (92.1 km2) of it is land and 0.1 square miles (0.2 km2) of it (0.22%) is water.

Demographics
As of the census of 2000, there were 882 people, 321 households, and 250 families residing in the town. The population density was 24.8 people per square mile (9.6/km2). There were 335 housing units at an average density of 9.4 per square mile (3.6/km2). The racial makeup of the town was 98.41% White, 0.23% African American, 0.79% Native American, and 0.57% from two or more races. Hispanic or Latino of any race were 0.45% of the population.

There were 321 households, out of which 35.2% had children under the age of 18 living with them, 69.8% were married couples living together, 4.0% had a female householder with no husband present, and 22.1% were non-families. 19.0% of all households were made up of individuals, and 8.1% had someone living alone who was 65 years of age or older. The average household size was 2.75 and the average family size was 3.12.

In the town, the population was spread out, with 26.5% under the age of 18, 7.6% from 18 to 24, 28.5% from 25 to 44, 25.7% from 45 to 64, and 11.7% who were 65 years of age or older. The median age was 38 years. For every 100 females, there were 99.5 males. For every 100 females age 18 and over, there were 102.5 males.

The median income for a household in the town was $50,221, and the median income for a family was $52,875. Males had a median income of $36,641 versus $26,875 for females. The per capita income for the town was $20,321. None of the families and 1.9% of the population were living below the poverty line, including no under eighteens and 5.1% of those over 64.

References

Towns in Oconto County, Wisconsin
Green Bay metropolitan area
Towns in Wisconsin